Tokio Hotel TV – Caught on Camera is a  DVD released by the German band Tokio Hotel on 9 December 2008. It provides an exclusive behind the scenes view of the Tokio Hotel's Concerts and the very best of Tokio Hotel TV.

Track listing

Standard Version

Deluxe Version
The deluxe version also comes with a poster of the band inside the DVD box.

Limited Fan Package Version
This version comes with a deluxe version of the DVD plus a brand new T-shirt of the band to accompany.

Chart positions

Weekly charts

Certifications

References

Tokio Hotel live albums
Live video albums
2008 video albums
2008 live albums
Tokio Hotel video albums